Edmund Freke (also spelled Freake or Freak; c. 1516–1591) was an English dean and bishop.

Life
He was born in Essex, and educated at Cambridge, gaining his M.A. there c. 1550.

In 1565 he was appointed Canon of the sixth stall at St George's Chapel, Windsor Castle, a position he held until 1572.

He was Dean of Salisbury and Dean of Rochester from 1571 to 1572 when he became Bishop of Rochester and was simultaneously Archdeacon of Canterbury in commendam. In 1575, he became Bishop of Norwich. There, unlike his predecessor John Parkhurst, he campaigned hard to impose uniformity in his diocese.

In 1579 he tried and then burnt a Norfolk plowwright, Matthew Hamont, for heresy.

In 1584, he became Bishop of Worcester. He was also appointed Lord Almoner, a position he held until his death.

Notes

1516 births
1591 deaths
Alumni of the University of Cambridge
Deans of Salisbury
Bishops of Norwich
Bishops of Rochester
Bishops of Worcester
Archdeacons of Canterbury
16th-century Church of England bishops
Deans of Rochester
Canons of Windsor